Bard-e Gapi-ye Charbiyun (also Romanized as Bard-e Gapī-ye Charbīyūn; also known as Bard-e Gapī-ye Chirbīyūn) is a village in Zilayi Rural District, Margown District, Boyer-Ahmad County, Kohgiluyeh and Boyer-Ahmad Province, Iran. At the 2006 census, its population was 34, in 6 families.

References 

Populated places in Boyer-Ahmad County